The 17th annual Nuestra Belleza México pageant, was held at the Auditorio Parque Las Maravillas in Saltillo, Coahuila, Mexico on September 25, 2010. The State of Jalisco, won for the third consecutive year with Karin Ontiveros, who later competed in Miss Universe 2011 in Brazil. Ontiveros was crowned by outgoing Nuestra Belleza México titleholder and Miss Universe 2010 Ximena Navarrete. She was the fourth Jalisciense to win this Title. Thirty-one contestants of the Mexican Republic competed for the national title.

The Nuestra Belleza Mundo México title was won by Cynthia de la Vega from Nuevo León, and she would compete in Miss World 2011 in United Kingdom. De la Vega was crowned by outgoing Nuestra Belleza Mundo México titleholder Anabel Solís. She was the third Neoleonesa to win this title, but she was dethroned 10 months later on July 29, 2011.

The Nuestra Belleza Internacional México title was won by Gabriela Palacio from Aguascalientes, who later competed in Miss International 2010 in China. Palacio was crowned by Miss International 2009 Anagabriela Espinoza after the show. On August 3, 2011 was announced that she would take the Nuestra Belleza Mundo México 2010 title and so she competed in Miss World 2011 in United Kingdom. She was the first Hidrocálida to win both Titles.

Karen Higuera from Baja California Sur was designated by the Nuestra Belleza México Organization as Nuestra Belleza Internacional México 2011 and later competed in Miss International 2011 in China. She was the first Sudcaliforniana to win this title.

The Recognition "Corona al Mérito 2010" was for Anagabriela Espinoza, Nuestra Belleza Mundo México 2007, Semi-finalist in Miss World 2008 and Miss International 2009.

Results

Placements

Order of announcements

Top 15
Morelos
Jalisco
Tamaulipas
Yucatán
Sonora
Nuevo León
Baja California Sur
Coahuila
Distrito Federal
Veracruz
Michoacán
Aguascalientes
Sinaloa
Aguascalientes
Jalisco

Top 10
Yucatán
Sonora
Nuevo León
Jalisco
Jalisco
Distrito Federal
Coahuila
Baja California Sur
Aguascalientes
Aguascalientes

Top 5
Aguascalientes
Coahuila
Distrito Federal
Jalisco
Nuevo León

Preliminary competition
The Preliminary Competition was held at the Auditorio of Parque Las Maravillas in Saltillo, Coahuila, Mexico a few days before to Final Competition. Prior to the final telecast, all contestants competed in swimsuit and evening gown as part of the selection for the others top 10 finalists who were revealed during the beginning of the two-hour live telecast of the Nuestra Belleza México 2010 Pageant live on Televisa on Saturday, September 25.

That night also took out the National Costume competition in which winning the representative from Sinaloa, Tiaré Oliva with "La Catrina". This costume was worn by the winner of Nuestra Belleza Mexico 2010 in Miss Universe 2011 winning the second place.

The Preliminary Competition was hosted by Alma Saint Martín and Patricio Cabezut.

Special awards

Judges
They were the same judges at the Preliminary and Final Competition.
Alberto Rodríguez – Fashion Designer
Alfonso Waithsman – Makeup Artist
Lissete Trapuad – Modeling Director & Director of RP
Celina Del Villar – Model
Jorge Aravena – Actor
Tony Dalton – Actor
Perla Beltrán – Nuestra Belleza Mundo México 2008
Elsa Burgos – Miss Costa Maya International 2002 & Television Hostess
Miguel Ángel Fox – Television Producer

Background music
Opening Number: "Nuestro México" by Contestants and "I Like It" by Enrique Iglesias ft. Pitbull
Swimsuit Competition: "Mi Niña Bonita", "Tu Angelito"  by Chino & Nacho
Evening Gown Competition: "Cuando Me Enamoro" by Enrique Iglesias ft. Juan Luis Guerra
Crowning Moment: "Nuestra Belleza" (Official Theme)

Contestants

Replacements
Querétaro – Natasha Kaufmann was the winner of Nuestra Belleza Querétaro 2010. The Suplente/1st Runner-up, María Perusquía was who represented Querétaro in Nuestra Belleza México 2010. Natasha Kaufmann quit the state crown for school reasons, as the University where she studies, didn't give away the opportunity to participate in the national pageant, which is why she was forced to resign.
Tamaulipas – Cecilia Ortíz was the winner of Nuestra Belleza Tamaulipas 2010. The Suplente/1st Runner-up, Claudia González was who represented Tamaulipas in Nuestra Belleza México 2010. Cecilia Ortíz quit the state crown for health problems that prevent her from participating in national competition.

Designated
Aguascalientes – Gabriela Palacio
Jalisco – Eunice Sánchez
San Luis Potosí – Paola Lastras
Sonora – Jessica Lerma

Returning states
Last competed in 2008:
Tabasco

Withdrawals
Colima – Geraldine Valencia since the early days of concentration she began to feel unwell, so she decided to retire from competition before health was affected differently.
Estado de México
Quintana Roo
Tlaxcala
Hidalgo

Significance
Jalisco won the Nuestra Belleza México title for the fourth time and for third consecutive year (before 2000, 2008 and 2009).
This year the crown of Nuestra Belleza México suffers his sixth change, this new model would continue only this year.
Nuevo León won the Nuestra Belleza Mundo México title for the third time (before 1995 and 2007).
This year the crown of Nuestra Belleza Mundo México suffers his third change, this new model would continue only this year.
Aguascalientes won the Nuestra Belleza Internacional México title for the first time and was The Suplente/1st Runner-up for the second time (before 1994) .
This year the crown of Nuestra Belleza Internacional México suffers his first change, this new model would continue only this year.
Baja California Sur was appointed as Nuestra Belleza Internacional México for the first time.
For the third time a Titleholder was dethroned to the title (Cynthia de la Vega, Nuestra Belleza Mundo México 2010).
For the third time a Titleholders resigned to the title (Natasha Kaufmann, Nuestra Belleza Querétaro 2004 and Cecilia Ortíz Nuestra Belleza Tamaulipas 2010).
For the first time in this pageant were together Miss Universe 2010 and Miss International 2009, both Mexicans.
Tabasco return to competition after two years (2008).
Jalisco was placed for the seventh consecutive year in the Top 5.
Jalisco and Nuevo León were placed for the eighth consecutive year.
Sonora was placed for the fifth consecutive year.
Aguascalientes and Sinaloa were placed for the third consecutive year.
Coahuila, Distrito Federal and Yucatán were placed for the second consecutive year.
Michoacán returned to making calls to the semi-finals after four years (2006), Morelos, Tamaulipas and Veracruz after three years (2007) and Baja California Sur after two years (2008).
States that were called to the semi-finals last year and this year failed to qualify were Baja California, Chiapas, Chihuahua, Estado de México, Querétaro and Zacatecas.
Distrito Federal won Personality Fraiche Award for the first time.
Jalisco won Miss Talent for the second time (before 2006), Steps to Fame Award for the first time, and Fuller Beauty Queen for the third consecutive year (after 2008 and 2009).
Morelos won Miss Sports for the first time.
Sinaloa won Best National Costume for the third time (before 2004 and 2003).
Sonora won Miss Top Model for the first time.
Tamaulipas won the Academic Award for the first time.
Yucatán won Contestants' Choice for the first time.
The host delegate, Cecilia Flores from Coahuila, won fourth place.
For fifth time Ernesto Laguardia hosted Nuestra Belleza México, and for second time with Marisol González and Alma San Martín.
Baja California Sur (Karen Higuera) is the higher delegate in this edition (1.82 m).
Puebla (Ana Laura Gallardo) is the lower delegate in this edition (1.68 m).
Delegates from Campeche, Colima, Distrito Federal, Guerrero, Nayarit, Morelos, Puebla, Tabasco and Zacatecas were elected by designation.

Contestant notes
Aguascalientes – Estefanía Herrera was Princess in Reina Nacional de la Feria de San Marcos 2010 in Aguascalientes. She is sister of Kimberly Herrera, Nuestra Belleza Aguascalientes 2008. Also she opened the center to make beauty queens in her state called "Stefy Herrera".
Aguascalientes – Gabriela Palacio is the first delegate from her state to obtain a national title of the Nuestra Belleza México organization. She competed in Miss International 2010, held at Sichuan Province Gymnasium in Chengdu, China on November 7, 2010 where she won Miss Photogenic Award. She previously won the title as Reina Nacional de la Feria de San Marcos 2009 in Aguascalientes. On August 3, 2011 Palacio was designated to represent Mexico in Miss World 2011 after having dismissed to Cynthia de la Vega. This event was held at the Earls Court Two in London, England on November 6, 2011, but she didn't place. She was the Local Director of Nuestra Belleza Aguascalientes in 2012.
Baja California Sur – Karen Higuera was selected to represent Mexico in Miss International 2011 held at the Sichuan Opera Theatre in Chengdu, China on November 6, 2011 where she won Miss Friendship Award, but she didn't place. Karen Higuera is the wife of the brother of Jessica García Formenti Nuestra Belleza Baja California Sur 2011.
Colima – Geraldine Valencia was elected as Reina de la Feria de Todos los Santos Colima 2009 in Colima on October 30, 2009.
Chiapas – Grissel Hernández competed in Miss All Nations 2012 where she won the Miss Charity Award.
Chihuahua – Pamela Olivas was elected Miss Earth Chihuahua 2009 and she represented her State in the national competition Miss Earth México 2009 in Yucatán, where she won the title of Miss Air (1st Runner-up).
Distrito Federal – Lucia Del Cueto is sister of María José Del Cueto, Nuestra Belleza Distrito Federal 2007. She was designated by the Miss México Travel Organization as Señorita Rostro de México 2011 giving the right to represent Mexico in Miss Supranational 2011 on August 27, 2011 in Plock, Poland, but as she was the Queen Award Personality Fraiche 2010 was necessarily be in the national competition of Nuestra Belleza México 2011 in August so that problems of dates with both contests is prevented from attending international competition of Miss Supranational 2011.
Guerrero – Suslim Patrón participated in Srita. Flor de Noche Buena 2009–2010 in the Feria de San Mateo Navidad y Año Nuevo de Chilpancingo held in Chilpancingo, Guerrero on November 21, 2009 where she won 2nd Place.
Jalisco – Karin Ontiveros represented Mexico in Miss Universe 2011 in the Credicard Hall in São Paulo, Brazil on September 12, 2011, but she didn't place. She won the second place in the National Costume competition with "La Catrina". Two months after competing in the Miss Universe 2011 pageant Ontiveros was pursuing a modeling career with Hollywood Model Management in Los Angeles. She currently appears on ESPN Deportes and ESPN Latin America on various programs and segments. In 2015 she is married.
Jalisco – Eunice Sánchez was designated as Miss Universidad World México 2010 and represented Mexico in World Miss University 2010 in Seoul, South Korea where she won Miss Best Dresser award and she made to Semi-finalists.
Michoacán – Karla Paulina Gutiérrez was elected by Miss Mexico Travel Organization to compete in Miss Tourism Queen International 2011 representing Mexico on December 27, 2011 in Xi'an, China, but she didn't place. She was elected Miss Gaming México 2012 and she represented Mexico in the Miss Gaming International 2012 pageant. Also she competed in Reina Mundial del Banano 2012 in Ecuador where she was 2nd Runner-up. Now she lives in Mexico City since 2011. After in 2015 she competed in Miss Grand México 2015 and finished Finalist in the Top 5 representing Distrito Federal.
Morelos – Melissa Torres is originally from Hermosillo, Sonora, but she represented the state of Morelos, where she currently lives, in Cuernavaca.
Nayarit – Priscila Zárate was crowned Miss Earth Nayarit 2011 and she competed in Miss Earth Mexico 2011 on September 16, 2011 in Cancún, Quintana Roo where she was a finalist in the Top 8.
Nuevo León – Cynthia de la Vega is a professional model who won the 2008 Elite Model Look Mexico contest and subsequently participated in the international final, held in Sanya, China on November 1 of that year. She would represent Mexico in Miss World 2011 but she was dethroned on July 29, 2011 for not fulfilling functions as the current reigning queen, and so she didn't compete in Miss World 2011.Also she is the niece of Letty Coppel, Señorita Sinaloa 1991 and 2nd Runner-up in Señorita México 1991. Currently she is studying finance at the Universidad de Monterrey in his native of San Pedro Garza García.
San Luis Potosí – Carmen Hernández competed in the second Reina Internacional del Transporte pageant in Duitama, Colombia on January 10, 2011 and won the first Crown for Mexico. At the time of her crown, broke the dress, revealing a breast for what the public immediately set his sights on it. Also she competed in Reina Internacional del Joropo pageant in Venezuela in July 2011 where she was 3rd Runner-up and she received the Reina de los Periodistas award. Also she won the right to represent Mexico in Miss Princess of the World 2011 held in Czech Republic on October 1, 2011 where she won the first crown for Mexico. She married on 2013.
Sonora – Jessica Lerma was elected to represent Mexico in Reina Mundial del Banano 2014 in Ecuador, where she was 2nd Runner-up and won the Best National Costume Award. On 2015 she was elected Miss Grand Huatabampo 2016 to compete in Miss Grand México 2016.Tabasco – Lilia Lucamendi lives in Mexico City for her studies.Veracruz – Diana Botello is a businesswoman, as she has her own Boutique called "Di-Bo Modelaje & Boutique" in which, in addition to selling Clothing Youth are also taught modeling classes for girls who want to aspire to a Beauty Title. She was Señorita Turismo y Cultura Veracruz 2008.Yucatán – María Fernanda López was born in Tehuacán, Puebla, but she represented the state of Yucatán as she has lived in Mérida for several years.

Crossovers
Contestants who had competed or will compete at other beauty pageants:

Miss Universe
 2011: Jalisco: Karin Ontiveros

Miss World
 2011: Aguascalientes: Gabriela Palacio

Miss International
 2010: Aguascalientes: Gabriela Palacio 
 2011: Baja California Sur: Karen Higuera

Miss Supranational
 2016: Nuevo León: Cynthia de la Vega (TBD)

World Miss University
 2010: Jalisco: Eunice Sánchez (Top 10)

Miss Tourism Queen International
 2011: Michoacán: Karla Paulina Gutiérrez

Miss Princess of the World
 2011: San Luis Potosí: Carmen Hernández (Winner)

Miss Gaming International
 2012: Michoacán: Karla Paulina Gutiérrez

Reina Mundial del Banano
 2012: Michoacán: Karla Paulina Gutiérrez (2nd Runner-up)
 2014: Sonora: Jessica Lerma (2nd Runner-up)

Miss All Nations
 2012: Chiapas: Grissel Hernández

Reina Internacional del Transporte
 2011: San Luis Potosí: Carmen Hernández (Winner)

Reina Internacional del Joropo
 2011: San Luis Potosí: Carmen Hernández (3rd Runner-up)

Miss Earth México
 2009: Chihuahua: Pamela Olivas (Miss Air/1st Runner-up)
 2011: Nayarit: Priscila Zárate (Top 8)

Miss Grand México
 2015: Michoacán: Karla Paulina Gutiérrez (Top 5)
 Distrito Federal's representative

Reina de la Feria de San Marcos
 2009: Aguascalientes: Gabriela Palacio (Winner)
 2010: Aguascalientes: Estefanía Herrera (Princess)

Señorita Flor de Noche Buena 
 2009: Guerrero: Suslim Patrón (1st Runner-up)

Nuestra Belleza Aguascalientes
 2010: Aguascalientes': Gabriela Palacio (Suplente/1st Runner-up)''

References

External links
Official Website

.México
2010 in Mexico
2010 beauty pageants